Rhododendron degronianum is a species of rhododendron native to northern parts of Honshu, the largest island of Japan, where it grows at altitudes of about .

Description
Its flowers are funnel-shaped and pink to white.

Taxonomy 
Rhododendron degronianum has three subspecies:
 Rhododendron degronianum subsp. degronianum – leaves with fawn to reddish indumentum
 Rhododendron degronianum subsp. heptamerum 
 Rhododendron degronianum subsp. yakushimanum – flowers pink fading to white, leaves with white indumentum on top, white to tan indumentum on bottom

Yakushimanum hybrids
The highly variable subspecies R. degronianum subsp. yakushimanum (formerly R. yakushimanum) is found wild only on the island of Yakushima, south of Kyushu Island of Japan, whose mountainous habitat and high rainfall make it an ideal climate for rhododendrons. This subspecies has only been known outside of Japan since 1934 when seedlings were sent to England. Its popularity spread rapidly throughout the world. It gave rise to numerous cultivars, which are still described as R. yakushimanum (often shortened to “yaku hybrids” or “yak hybrids”) in the horticultural literature. The following have achieved the Royal Horticultural Society’s Award of Garden Merit:
R. degronianum subsp. yakushimanum 
’Hachmann's Polaris' 
’Hydon Dawn’ 
’Koichiro Wada’

References 

 "Rhododendron degronianum", Rev. Hort. 1869: 368 1869.

External links 

 The Plant List

degronianum
Endemic flora of Japan
Taxa named by Élie-Abel Carrière